Stephen Cruickshank (born September 10, 1983 in Bointcumana) is a Trinidadian soccer player, currently without a club.

Career

Professional
Cruickshank began his professional career in Trinidad with Caledonia AIA in 2006. He first moved to the Cleveland City Stars in 2007, playing in two matches and recording 18 minutes of USL Second Division play, but missed much of the season with a high ankle sprain.

He returned to Trinidad in 2008, playing for St. Ann's Rangers and Ma Pau, before re-joining the Cleveland City Stars in the USL First Division in 2009.

International
Cruickshank has been capped four times by the Trinidad and Tobago national football team.

Personal
Cruikshank is greatly involved with Athletes in Action, a Christian sports ministry organization associated with the Campus Crusade for Christ, and acts as a director of the organization's Rising Stars program.

References

External links
 Cleveland City Stars bio

1983 births
Living people
Cleveland City Stars players
Trinidad and Tobago footballers
Trinidad and Tobago expatriate footballers
USL First Division players
USL Second Division players
TT Pro League players
Trinidad and Tobago international footballers
Association football defenders